A Trip to Paris is a 1938 American comedy film directed by Malcolm St. Clair and starring Jed Prouty, Shirley Deane and Spring Byington. It was part of the Jones Family series of films. In the film, the family take a vacation to Paris.

The film's sets were designed by the art directors Haldane Douglas and Bernard Herzbrun.

Partial cast
 Jed Prouty as John Jones  
 Shirley Deane as Bonnie Thompson  
 Spring Byington as Mrs. John Jones  
 Russell Gleason as Herbert Thompson  
 Kenneth Howell as Jack Jones  
 George Ernest as Roger Jones  
 June Carlson as Lucy Jones  
 Florence Roberts as Granny Jones  
 Billy Mahan as Bobby Jones  
 Marvin Stephens as Tommy McGuire  
 Joan Valerie as Marguerite Varloff 
 Harold Huber as Willie Jones  
 Nedda Harrigan as Countess Varloff  
 Leonid Kinskey as Emile  
 Clay Clement as Duroche

References

Bibliography
 Bernard A. Drew. Motion Picture Series and Sequels: A Reference Guide. Routledge, 2013.

External links
 

1938 films
1938 comedy films
American comedy films
Films directed by Malcolm St. Clair
20th Century Fox films
American black-and-white films
1930s English-language films
1930s American films